Natural History of an Alien, also known as Anatomy of an Alien in the US, is an early Discovery Channel mockumentary similar to Alien Planet, aired in 1998. This mockumentary featured various alien ecosystem projects from the Epona Project to Ringworld. It also featured many notable scientists and science fiction authors such as Dr. Jack Cohen, Derek Briggs, Christopher McKay, David Wynn-Williams, Emily Holton, Peter Cattermole, Brian Aldiss, Sil Read, Wolf Read, Edward K. Smallwood, Adega Zuidema, Steve Hanly, Kevin Warwick and Dougal Dixon.

Plot
The viewer is in an intergalactic spaceship named the S.S. Attenborough, run by a small green alien.

Cambrian Earth
Earth during the Cambrian.

Mars

Asteroids
The documentary visits asteroids and talks about the possibility of panspermia seeding solar system with life.

Europa

Featured organisms
 Europa Cone Bacteria: Orange-gray bacteria that grow in huge towers that rise many miles above the ocean floor. Inside these vents, warm water rises, nourishing layer upon layer of bacteria.
 Europa Sea Vent Herbivore: A giant, gray, shark-like swimmer that feeds on bacteria in schools with a suction cup-like mouth on an extended, Opabinia-like trunk. These trunk-shaped mouths pierce the vents to suck in vast quantities of bacteria. These grazers are territorial and, like squid on Earth, flash warning glows to drive away rivals. They make a series of dolphin-like cries.
 Europa Sea Vent Carnivore: A predatory, yellow-green, echolocating, streamlined, shark-like swimmer that is built for speed and preys on the Europa Sea Vent Herbivores. Like the Europa Sea Vent Herbivores, the Europa Sea Vent Carnivores also have an Opabinia-like snout, which they use to kill their prey.

High Gravity Planet
The next world visited is a high gravity planet home to many insect-like aliens who have adapted to 1.5 times Earth's gravity. High gravity means a thicker atmosphere (the planet in question having an atmosphere 15 times as dense as Earth's) and therefore easier flight.

Featured organisms
 Pteropede: A gray-green, millipede-like creature from High Gravity Planet with accordion-folding, dragon-like wings. It resembles a dragonfly when it flies. It may be able to take advantage over of the denser air to fly, but high gravity can lead to a bumpy landing. To support its great weight, the creature's eight legs are directly under its body. It breathes through lungs in the tip of its tail, which is more efficient than the way insects take in air, so the Pteropede is able to pump oxygen through its large, heavy body. To grow, the Pteropede must enter the water. It is only in the buoyancy of water, where gravity has little effect, that the Pteropede can shed its skin and increase in size. Once the new skin is hardened, the Pteropede can return to the demanding heavy gravity environment on land.
 Sputnik Bug: A small, blue, Eoarthropleura-like creature from High Gravity Planet named after Sputnik 1, the first artificial satellite in orbit. It has spines to protect it from a dangerous fall. Whenever it does fall, it immediately rolls up in a ball when it starts to tumble.
 Splatter Bug: A small, brown, eurypterid-like creature from High Gravity Planet. It sadly has nothing to protect its soft body. It's an evolutionary dead-end.

Helliconia
The documentary visits the science fiction world of Helliconia, which was created by Brian Aldiss. It's a binary system and they show how life can adapt to having two suns.

Featured organism
 Helliconian Tree, a strange-looking tree from Helliconia with a cooling tower-shaped trunk with branches on the very top that sprout narrow leaves, making the branch look like a moth antenna during the short summers. Like deciduous trees on Earth, the Helliconian Tree turns dormant during snow-filled winters. It sheds its leaves but its branches curl up and go inside the Tree. The Tree then shields its top with an ice-like cap it grows.

Sulfuria
The documentary visits the science fiction world of Sulfuria, which was created by Dougal Dixon. It's a sulfur rich world that is similar to Io.

Featured organisms
 Sulfurian Balloon Plant: A tall, orange organism from Sulfuria that lives off of sunlight. They are like giant balloons, anchored to the ground and buoyed up by the gas inside of their flattish, pizza-like tops. They are like kelp on Earth. Babies sprout from the sides of the parent plant and eventually break off, becoming independent adults.
 Parachute Worm: A whitish-gray, earthworm-like creature that lives off the gas of the Sulfurian Balloon Plant by sucking it out. Newly-born larvae resemble twigs with two umbrella-like extensions. Larvae are born live as the mother is feeding. After a little while, the young depart from their mothers and use the umbrella-like extensions to parachute down gently through the murk of the atmosphere to the planet floor, after which the umbrellas are shed. After falling into water and shedding, the young Parachute Worms feed on the nutritious roots of the Sulfurian Balloon Plants. When they have fattened up, the adults make their epic journey back up the stalks to mate. The Parachute Worm is a perpetual migrant. Its lifecycle is a response to this extreme environment.

Epona
The next world visited is Epona, an imaginary ecosystem created by group of scientists and science fiction writers called The Epona Project and begun by Martyn J. Fogg.

Epona is an offshoot of the Contact - Cultures Of The Imagination, a bi-yearly conference, where scientists and Science Fiction authors come together and discuss how the human race may progress in space.
The 2012 event program is here. James Funaro is a guest on the Space Show Blog #3466  and describes one year's conference.
The contact idea came from an original premise by Joel Hagen and James Funaro, instructor of Anthropology at Cabrillo College, Palo Alto. Two groups of COTI Attendees are provided with simulated planetary conditions, then have to devise a species to fit in that ecology and that develops spaceflight and has "First contact" with one another, one race may be human. The process was described in 
This later developed into COTI - the roleplaying half simulating "first contact" and "The Bateson Project" - which is the strictly scientific disciplines come together. Science Fiction authors involved include Karen and Poul Anderson.

[1] http://www.contact-conference.org
[2] http://www.contact-conference.org/c12d.html (On the wayback internet archive).
{3}

Featured organisms
 Epona Pagoda Tree: A thin-trunked, green, sessile photosynthetic animal that appears like a tree surrounded by large, disk-shaped "leaves" which are evolved limbs. The "leaves" grow very large in order to get as much carbon dioxide as possible. While sessile, the trees are capable of a remarkable range of movement, a trait inherited from their mobile ancestors. If a "herbivore" comes to nibble on them, they are able to fold back their branches.
 Spring Croc: A green, hopping, one-legged, predatory, Venus flytrap-like creature and the major predator on Epona. It lies in wait for its prey, usually while partially submerged. It's extremely vicious and mostly focuses on eating. It does not need to be intelligent, it just has to be quiet.
 Uther: A brownish-gray flyer resembling a cross between a Sharovipteryx and a pterosaur. They are descended from flying fish-like ancestors. They started out in their avian-like lifestyle hunting Salacopods (small, amphibian-like creatures) and later adapted to feeding on larger carcasses. They then started to become predators themselves. In order to fly, they use a combination of hydrogen peroxide and ethanol to hyper-oxygenate their blood, which allows them incredible stamina.

Greenworld

The documentary then visits the science fiction world of Greenworld, which was created by Dougal Dixon. It is an Earth-like planet filled with lush rainforests.

Featured organisms
 Curlywhorl: An arboreal, purple-red, centipede/iguana-like creature evolved from aquatic, sea star-like ancestors like all the other inhabitants of Greenworld.
 Pud: A small, green, three-eyed, weevil-like creature from Greenworld's equator. There are thousands of species across the planet. They are like the beetles of Earth. The featured species has six limbs, five of which are used for grasping and one for movement. This gives the Pud a hopping gait. They are often seen in groups, foraging for fallen fruit in the undergrowth. They have many predators and can sense danger coming with their three sensitive, leaf-like antennae. Puds make a series of chirps and hoots.
 Kwank: A large, reddish-brown, robber crab-like creature from Greenworld with a turtle-like shell on its back. It feeds on Puds.
 Unidentified large, lobster-like predator: An inhabitant of Greenworld that sometimes attacks and eats Kwanks. It's only shown in the form of its shadow.

Artificial Life
On Greenworld, the ship encounters an artificial lifeforms from a robotic cube ship. It uses solar panels to gather energy and mines asteroids to get resources to grow. It even sends down a probe resembling a metallic centipede to Greenworld to explore it. At the end of the film, the narrator is revealed to be a little green man-like female alien.

References

External links

Discovery Channel: Alien Planet
Epona Project
Speculative Visions

British television specials
1998 television specials
Speculative evolution
Extraterrestrial life in popular culture
Discovery Channel original programming